Han Song-yi (Hangul: 한송이; born 5 September 1984) is a South Korean volleyball player.

National Team 
She was part of the silver medal winning team at the 2010 Asian Games and also competed for South Korea at the 2012 Summer Olympics.  She was part of the South Korea women's national volleyball team at the 2010 FIVB Volleyball Women's World Championship in Japan. She played with Heungkuk Life Insurance.

After being absent during six years, she was included in the National Team for the 2020 Tokyo Summer Olympics.

References

External links

Han Songyi at fivb.org

1984 births
Living people
South Korean women's volleyball players
Asian Games medalists in volleyball
Volleyball players at the 2006 Asian Games
Volleyball players at the 2010 Asian Games
Volleyball players at the 2014 Asian Games
Olympic volleyball players of South Korea
Volleyball players at the 2012 Summer Olympics
Volleyball players at the 2004 Summer Olympics
Asian Games gold medalists for South Korea
Asian Games silver medalists for South Korea
Medalists at the 2014 Asian Games
Medalists at the 2010 Asian Games
People from Osan
Sportspeople from Gyeonggi Province
20th-century South Korean women
21st-century South Korean women